Clotiapine (Entumine) is an atypical antipsychotic of the dibenzothiazepine chemical class. It was first introduced in a few European countries (namely, Belgium, Italy, Spain and Switzerland), Argentina, Taiwan and Israel in 1970.

Some sources regard clotiapine as a typical antipsychotic rather than atypical due to its high incidence of extrapyramidal side effects compared to the atypicals like clozapine and quetiapine, to which it is structurally related. Despite its profile of a relatively high incidence of extrapyramidal side effects it has demonstrated efficacy in treatment-resistant individuals with schizophrenia according to a number of psychiatrists with clinical experience with it, some weak clinical evidence supports this view too. A systematic review compared clotiapine with other antipsychotic drugs:

References 

Atypical antipsychotics
Piperazines
Dibenzothiazepines